The Pigeon River is a small river flowing to Lake Michigan on the western Lower Peninsula of the U.S. state of Michigan. Via Lake Michigan and the larger Great Lakes system, it is part of the watershed of the St. Lawrence River.

Course
The Pigeon River's watershed and course are located entirely in western Ottawa County. The river is formed by a confluence of agricultural drainage ditches in Olive Township and flows generally west-southwestward into Port Sheldon Township.

Two county-operated public parks, Pigeon Creek Park and Hemlock Crossing, are located along the lower course of the river. The river has been stocked annually with brown trout by the Michigan Department of Natural Resources since 2003.

Watershed characteristics

The Pigeon River watershed is located in portions of seven townships of Ottawa County:

Formerly covered by forests and wetlands including a black ash swamp that covered 75% of the watershed, by the 1920s most of the watershed had been cleared and drained for agriculture. Portions of the watershed were reforested in the 1940s to control wind erosion. A 1997 watershed management plan found that approximately half of the land in the Pigeon River watershed was used for agriculture, with most of this area in Blendon, Olive, and Robinson townships. Agricultural production in the watershed included ornamental nursery crops, Christmas tree, blueberries, upland vegetables, field crops, turkeys, poultry eggs, beef and dairy cattle, and hogs.

Land use in the watershed as of 1992 was as follows:

Tributaries
This is a list of named streams in the Pigeon River watershed (aside from the Pigeon River itself), as identified by the National Hydrography Dataset.  The list's default order is from the mouth of the river to its source.

See also
List of rivers of Michigan

Notes

References

Rivers of Michigan
Rivers of Ottawa County, Michigan
Tributaries of Lake Michigan